New Jersey Resources is an energy services holding company based in Wall Township, New Jersey. It is a Fortune 1000 company and a member of the Forbes Platinum 400. New Jersey Natural Gas is its principal subsidiary.

References

External links

http://findarticles.com/p/articles/mi_m0EIN/is_2005_July_21/ai_n14811765

Companies based in New Jersey
Companies listed on the New York Stock Exchange